The following is a list of programs broadcast on MGM+.

Original programming

Drama

Comedy

Unscripted

Docuseries

Variety

Co-productions

Continuations

Original films

Scripted

Documentaries

Stand-up comedy specials

Upcoming original programming

Drama

Unscripted

Docuseries

In development

Upcoming original films

Feature films

Notes

References

External links 
 

 
MGM+